Grimm's Snow White is a 2012 American fantasy film produced by The Asylum and directed by Rachel Lee Goldenberg. Loosely based on the Brothers Grimm fairy tale Snow White, the film stars Jane March, Eliza Bennett and Jamie Thomas King.

Plot 
Long ago, a meteor crashed into Earth where it burned eternally and became known as the Viridian Flame and the ultimate source of power. The flame begat two races; dragons, the defenders of the flame and elves, the guardians of the flame. The elves each carried a stone which holds the power of the flame and gives them power, but most of the elves integrated into the human kingdoms to live normal lives. The humans however, began enslaving the elves for their power which caused unrest in the kingdoms leaving many to look toward the prophecy of “the mighty luminary” who will unite the land and bring peace for 1000 years.

Many years later, the story of the Viridian Flame has become a myth in the neighboring kingdoms of military powerhouse Whitevale and Northfalia, which according to legend has the Viridian Flame somewhere on its land. Princess Snow White of Whitevale has just returned to her kingdom upon the death of her father, having spent the last several years at a convent. Her father just signed a peace treaty between the kingdoms and Prince Alexander of Northfalia is coming to pay his respects to the King, where he meets Snow White. Snow White's stepmother, Queen Gwendolyn, has several elven stones she uses to draw power from and consult her magic mirror, who tells her that Snow White's beauty has usurped her own. Furious, Gwendolyn has her Huntsman Beasley (who she is having an affair with and who helped her arrange the king's death) take Snow White into the woods with a queen's guard and bring back her heart. In the woods, they are attacked by a dragon before Beasley can kill Snow White, and he brings back the guard's heart instead after he is killed by the dragon. Gwendolyn feeds the heart to her dogs and informs Prince Alexander of her death after he asks for Snow White's hand in marriage.

In the woods, Snow White is wounded and saved by an elf, Runt, who brings her back to his dwelling in the woods where their leader elf, Orlando, adamantly opposes her being there. At the castle, Gwendolyn starts plotting to marry Alexander so she can find the Viridian Flame but her mirror informs her that Snow White still lives. Gwendolyn feeds Huntsman Beasley to her dogs for his betrayal. She sends men into the forest to find and interrogate some elves for Snow White's location. When that proves unsuccessful, she sends her pack of massive dogs into the woods to hunt Snow White down.

Prince Alexander also searches the forest and saves Snow White from the dogs and defeats a dragon while she escapes. Alexander searches for Snow White afterwards at Orlando's home nearby but Orlando has her hidden and he turns the Prince away. Orlando worries of what Gwendolyn is plotting and asks the Dark Elves, guardians of the Viridian Flame, to help them wage war against Whitevale but they refuse. Snow White and Runt attempt to the infiltrate the castle so she can speak with Alexander but she in unsuccessful and Runt is captured by the Queen's men. Gwendolyn then uses elf magic to transform herself into a crone and make a poison ring. She visits the market, where she encounters Snow White and gives her the ring which causes her to fall into a death like sleep.

At the castle, Alexander finds a stable boy who is wearing Snow White's ring and he takes it. The elves think Snow White has been killed and preparing a funeral pyre when Alexander arrives and replaces the ring Gwendolyn gave her with her own ring which breaks the spell. Alexander's Advisor Hugh betrays him and tells Gwendolyn of her plan's failure and she attacks with her army. With the elves, Alexander and Snow White fight back and are eventually assisted by the Dark Elves. Gwendolyns army overpowers the elves, and she attempts a quick forced marriage between herself and Alexander. Snow White manages to break free and decapitate Gwendolyn before the ceremony can be finished. The kingdoms are united when Snow White and Alexander marry and peace is restored.

Cast 
Eliza Bennett as Snow White
Jane March as Queen Gwendolyn
Jamie Thomas King as Prince Alexander
Eberhard Wagner as the King
Otto Jankovich as Hugh the Advisor
Ben Maddox as Huntsman Beasley
Sebastian Wimmer as Runt
Alan Burgon as Orlando
Frauke Steiner as Mara
Sabine Kranzelbinder as Isabella
Eric Lomas as Cyrus
Klara Steinhauser as Allura
Bernhard Georg Rusch as Wally Stable Boy
Lukas Johne as Dungeon Master
Mac Salamon as Captain
Thomas Nash as Hunter Aberle
Alexander T. T. Mueller as Priest
Magdalena Hall as Servant
Mathias Hacker as Human Prisoner (Harry)
Stefan Fent as Queen's Guard Solis
Benjamin Kornfeld as Queen's Guard Berkley
Marcus Schramm as Queen's Guard Savage
Stefan Kurt Reiter as Queen's Guard Rolins
David Heissig as Wood Elf
Sonja Chan as Dark Elf #1
Lucius Wolter as Dark Elf #2
David Szalai as Dark Elf #3
Sarah Xiao Mingruber as Dark Elf #4
Enis Bunjaku as Elf

Production 
The film was shot on location in and around Vienna, Austria.

Release 
Grim's Snow White was released on video-on-demand, DVD, and Blu-ray February 14, 2012, several months ahead of Universal's Snow White and the Huntsman.

Reception 
Grantland said in an editorial on The Asylum that "Grimm’s Snow White, it turns out, does well enough. The story is adequate, the set design is strong, and star Jane March gives a commendably icy performance. Those virtues coexist alongside Prince Alexander fighting giant, terribly rendered CGI dogs, but they’re virtues nonetheless."

See also
 List of films about witchcraft

References

External links 
 
 

The Asylum films
2012 direct-to-video films
2012 fantasy films
2012 independent films
2012 films
American dark fantasy films
American independent films
Films about royalty
Films based on Snow White
Films directed by Rachel Lee Goldenberg
Films set in the Middle Ages
Films shot in Los Angeles
2010s English-language films
2010s American films